Two highways in the U.S. state of Nevada have been signed as Route 40:
U.S. Route 40 (Nevada), replaced by Interstate 80
Nevada State Route 40 (1935), which existed until the 1970s renumbering